The Punjab Rattan Award, is a type of award given by the Government of Punjab for exceptional excellence and achievement in the service of Punjab or international level in the field of art, literature, culture, science, technology, politics and achievements at the international level. The award consists of the Punjab Rattan Award itself, Punjabi silver plaque and a Punjab Rattan Award citation. The prestigious award, in Punjab, is considered to be as prized and valued as the much sought-after Maharaja Ranjit Singh Award.

Awardees
 Smt. Amrita Pritam
 Khushwant Singh, Writer
 Yash Chopra, Film Director
 S. K. Sama, Endocrinologist and Padma Shri awardee
 Ranbir Chander Sobti, Cell biologist and Padma Shri awardee
 Hira Lall Sibal, Jurist and Padma Bhushan recipient
 Dr Rajneesh Kapoor - Senior Director , Interventional Cardiology , Medanta The Medicity, Gurgaon, India
Jagjit Singh Dardi, Senior Sikh Journalist, Chairman Chardikla Time Tv ( year 2000)

References

External links

Punjabi culture
Civil awards and decorations of Punjab, India